La Bomba may refer to:

Music
"La Bomba" (Ricky Martin song), 1998
"La Bomba" (Azul Azul song), 2000, also covered by King Africa

Books
La Bomba, a book by José Antonio Gurriarán

People
Juan Carlos Navarro (basketball) or La Bomba (born 1980), Spanish basketball player
Alberto Tomba or Tomba la Bomba (born 1966), Italian alpine skier

See also
Bomba (disambiguation)
La Bamba (disambiguation)